The American artist Paulette Van Roekens was born in farmhouse outside of Château-Thierry, France late New Year's Eve 1895. At a young age, she emigrated to the United States with her parents, Victor (a horticulturalist) and Jeanne van Roekens, to reside in Glenside, Pennsylvania.

In 1915, Van Roekens enrolled in the Philadelphia School of Design for Women (now Moore College of Art and Design), where she was awarded the John Sartain Fellowship (1916). She also attended classes at the Pennsylvania Academy of Fine Arts, and studied sculpture at the Graphic Sketch Club of Philadelphia. She also studied under Henry B. Snell, Leopold Seyffert, Joseph Pearson, and Charles Grafly. She became a professor at the Moore College of Art in drawing and painting in 1923, a position she held for almost 40 years. At the time of her retirement in 1961, the College presented her with an honorary doctorate.

In 1927 she married a colleague at Moore, Arthur Meltzer, a respected artist in his own right. They had two children, Davis Paul and Joanne. She and Melzer lived in the Philadelphia area for the rest of their lives. They each had a studio in the family home, but painted subjects from New York as well as outdoor scenes from excursions to Europe.

She worked in a variety of media and is well known for her oils and pastels. Still lifes are prominent in her early work, but as her career developed she turned more and more to landscapes. She called herself a “sometimes impressionist” because while she was strongly influenced by impressionism she found it difficult to completely break with academic drawing. She exhibited throughout her career, with 14 solo exhibitions (her first in 1920) and two retrospective exhibitions with her husband. Her final exhibition was only a few months before her death on January 11, 1988.
 
Her work is represented at the Corcoran Gallery of Art, the National Academy of Design, the Carnegie Institute, the Art Institute of Chicago, the Mint Museum (Charlotte, N.C.), the Albright Gallery, and the Detroit Institute of Art. She held memberships in the Art Alliance of America and the National Association of Women Painters and Sculptors.

Partial List of Works 
 Victory Loan on Chestnut Street, 1918
 Girard Bank, (World War I Victory Loan), 1919
 Towers in the Mist, 1925
 City Hall Towers, 1928
 The Horse with the Lavender Eye, 1939
 Midsummer Dreams, n.d.
 Sawdust and Spangles, n.d.
 Under the Spotlight, n.d.
 15th St. from Broad St. Station
 The New Boulevard
 Treat 'Em Rough
 Gray Towers

Awards 
 Gold medal, Plastic Club, 1920
 Gold medal, Philadelphia Sketch Club, 1923
 Pennsylvania Academy of Fine Arts fellowship prize, 1928
 Exhibition prizes, Woodmere Art Gallery, 1946, 1956
 Honorable Mention, National Association of Women Painters and Sculptors

References

External links 
 Michener Museum
 Peirce Galleries

1895 births
1988 deaths
20th-century American painters
American Impressionist painters
Artists from Philadelphia
Philadelphia School of Design for Women alumni
Moore College of Art and Design faculty
American women painters